Półczno  is a village in Gmina Studzienice, Bytów County, Pomeranian Voivodeship, in northern Poland.

From 1975 to 1998 the village was in Słupsk Voivodeship.

It had a population of 380 in 2006.

Transport
Półczno lies along the national road .

References

Map of the Gmina Studzienice

Villages in Bytów County